Romulus globosus is a species of beetle in the family Cerambycidae, the only species in the genus Romulus.

References

Elaphidiini